Laurens "Lauke" Pluijmaekers (born September 22, 1984), last name sometimes spelled Pluymaekers, is a Dutch former professional Unreal Tournament player. Lauke won the gold medal in Unreal Tournament 2004 at the World Cyber Games 2004.

Notable achievements

Tournament and placement
Source:
2005 ESWC 2005 UT2004, Paris: #3
2005 ECG 2005 UT2004, Hannover: #3
2005 GGL Digitallife UT2004, New York: #1
2004 EOGC 2004 UT2004, London: #1
2004 ESWC 2004 UT2004, Poitiers: #3
2004 WCG 2004 UT2004, San Francisco: #1
2004 cXg UT2004, Las Vegas: #1
2003 WCG 2003 UT2003, Seoul: #2
2003 ESWC 2003 UT2003, Poitiers: #5
2003 Euskal 11 UT2003, Bilbao: #1
2002 WCG 2002 UT, Daejon: #5
2001 WCG 2001 UT, Seoul: #4

Awards
2004 UT2004 Player of The Year

References

Dutch esports players
Unreal (video game series) players
Living people
1984 births
Fnatic players